Home of the Brave is a 2006 American war drama film following the lives of four Army National Guard soldiers in Iraq and their return to the United States. The film was shot in Morocco and in Spokane, Washington.

Plot
Shortly after learning their unit will soon return home, American soldiers Lieutenant Colonel Dr. William Marsh (Samuel L. Jackson), Sergeant Vanessa Price (Jessica Biel), Specialists Tommy Yates (Brian Presley) Jamal Aiken (Curtis "50 Cent" Jackson), and Private Jordan Owens (Chad Michael Murray) are on their final mission, in a vehicle in a convoy bringing medical supplies to a remote Iraqi village. They are ambushed by insurgents. The forward vehicles of the convoy are trapped in a narrow street and forced to fight the attackers. The rear vehicles manage to escape the initial barrage by taking a side-street, only to be met with an improvised explosive device hidden in the carcass of a dead dog. Sgt. Price, the driver, is seriously wounded, as her front seat passenger is killed instantly. A soldier in their team is shot and killed pursuing the young boys who left the bomb and other attackers.

Aiken, Yates and Owens head out to fight the attackers. Aiken trips on loose bricks from a broken wall and injures his back, so Yates and Owens continue alone, finding the shooters in a graveyard. Wounded in the leg, Yates falls behind as Owens races after the shooter. However, the shooter has surreptitiously moved, and Owens is shot from behind. Yates arrives, but the shooter is already gone, and it is too late for Owens, who dies in Yates' arms.

At a field hospital, a mortar attack injures multiple personnel and destroys many vehicles.  The medical staff, including Marsh, is struggling to care for the wounded and dying as mortars rain down upon the compound.  A young soldier carries his squad-mate into the trauma care ward. While Marsh addresses another soldier's wounds, the man draws a Beretta pistol and threatens to shoot him if he doesn't take care of his dying companion right away.  Another squad-mate comes up and pulls the threatening soldier away. Price and Aiken are transported via medevac helicopter to a field hospital; Price's right hand is amputated. Aiken survives his wounds and returns to the unit when they rotate back to the US. Price is remanded to a formal hospital for physical therapy and fitting for a non-functioning rubber prosthesis.

Upon returning home, the main characters have a hard time returning to civilian life.  Price struggles with day-to-day things, like learning to unbutton her clothing with only one hand, while trying to resume her job as a crippled P.E. teacher and basketball coach. Yates is unemployed, having lost his job at a gun shop during his deployment. His father pushes him towards the police academy, but Yates, witnessing the self-destruction of Aiken, who had become frustrated and angry at being denied VA benefits for his back injury and the rejection of his girlfriend, walks out of the academy's entrance exam.

Marsh begins to slip into self-destructive behavior as his son, angry about the senselessness of the war and what it's done to his family, gets into trouble at school.  Drunk on Thanksgiving Day, Marsh brings home three yard workers for dinner to the dismay of his family. Afterwards, his wife catches him in his study with a loaded pistol contemplating suicide. He agrees to go to therapy for PTSD. There, he reveals that he does not feel any emotion over the soldiers that died, but as a doctor he believes he should.  The conflict had slowly eaten away at him until he could not control it anymore.

Aiken is shot and killed by the police at the small fast-food diner where his girlfriend worked; a result of him taking her and her co-workers hostage with a pistol to force her to talk to him. Marsh's wife reaffirms her love for him and offers to help him through counseling. Price falls in love with another coach at her school, whom she had rejected earlier while trying to transition back to her life. Yates has an emotional outburst at his father's shop and re-enlists. As the film ends, Marsh's son is happily playing in a soccer match at Price's school. Price introduces her new boyfriend to Marsh's wife and confirms dinner plans with them. Yates undergoes basic training again and is shown patrolling the streets of an Iraqi city.

Cast
 Samuel L. Jackson as Lieutenant Colonel Dr. William "Will" Marsh M.D.
 Jessica Biel as Sergeant Vanessa Price
 Brian Presley as Specialist Tommy Yates
 Curtis "50 Cent" Jackson as Specialist Jamal Aiken
 Chad Michael Murray as Private Jordan Owens
 Christina Ricci as Sarah Schivino
 Victoria Rowell as Penelope Marsh
 Vyto Ruginis as Hank Yates

Reception

Box office
The film was opened in only 3 theaters in 2006 and earned $51,708 at the box office domestically and $447,912 in the rest of the world. Originally released on December 15, 2006 for Oscar consideration, the production studio re-thought the release pattern and decided to pull it from theaters, planning on showing it to a wider audience later in the year. It was re-released on May 11, 2007 in 44 theaters, but this did not increase the film's financial earnings.

Critical reception
On Rotten Tomatoes the film has an approval rating of 22% based on reviews from 58 critics. The site's consensus stated: "The ensemble cast works hard, but hammy direction and a script lacking in nuance ruins this movie’s noble intentions." On Metacritic it has a score of 42% based on reviews from 15 critics.

The A.V. Club named it in its top 100 flops. TV Guide gave the film 2 stars out of 4 and commented that the film "starts with a bang and ends in a long, protracted whimper" and Stephen Holden from The New York Times said you "feel as if you have just sat through an earnest made-for-television movie" and in the end "an honorable dud".

Home media
The Numbers reported 236,905 units sold, accounting for revenue of $4,735,731.

Awards
It was nominated for a Golden Globe award for Best Original Song ("Try Not to Remember") which was performed by Sheryl Crow. Jessica Biel and Samuel L. Jackson each received a Prism Award nomination for Performance in a Feature Film.

References

External links
 
 
 
 

2006 films
2000s war drama films
American war drama films
Films directed by Irwin Winkler
Films set in Iraq
Films set in the United States
Iraq War films
Metro-Goldwyn-Mayer films
Nu Image films
Films produced by Irwin Winkler
Films about the United States Army
2006 drama films
Films about veterans
2000s English-language films
2000s American films